Wyoming Highway 218 (WYO 218) was an American state highway in southwestern Laramie County, Wyoming, east of Buford and west of Cheyenne. WYO 218, named Harriman Road, traveled from Interstate 80 and US 30 (Exit 342) south for only  as state maintenance ended there. The roadway continued south as Laramie County Route 102 (Harriman Road) to the Colorado State Line and the town of Harriman. From there the roadway continues in Colorado as Larimer County Route 37, named Red Mountain Road, to US 287. Mileposts along WYO 218 increased from north to south.

The route was decommissioned in 2009; all state route marker signs have been removed, and the route no longer appears on the Wyoming Official State Highway Map.

Major intersections

References

External links 

Cheyenne @ RockyMountainRoads.com
WYO 218 - I-80/US 30 to Harriman

Transportation in Laramie County, Wyoming
218